Agnippe miniscula is a moth of the family Gelechiidae. It is found in China (Xinjiang).

The wingspan is 6–8 mm. The forewings have a light brown basal patch, with two brown spots separated by white scales. The hindwings are light grey. Adults are on wing from June to July.

References

Moths described in 1993
Agnippe
Moths of Asia